Qeshlaq-e Hajji Avaz (also Romanized as Qeshlāq-e Ḩājjī ‘Avaẕ) is a village in Tazeh Kand Rural District, Tazeh Kand District, Parsabad County, Ardabil Province, Iran. At the 2006 census, its population was 1,072, in 208 families.

References 

Towns and villages in Parsabad County